Shimer Great Books School (pronounced  ) is a Great Books college that is part of North Central College in Naperville, Illinois. Prior to 2017, Shimer was an independent, accredited college on the south side of Chicago, with a history of being in different cities in Illinois prior to that.  

Founded in 1853 as the Mount Carroll Seminary in Mount Carroll, Illinois, the school became affiliated with the University of Chicago in 1896 and was renamed the Frances Shimer Academy after founder Frances Wood Shimer. It was renamed Shimer College in 1950, when it began offering a four-year curriculum based on the Hutchins Plan of the University of Chicago. After the University of Chicago parted with both the college and the Hutchins Plan in 1958, Shimer continued to use a version of that curriculum. The college relocated to Waukegan in 1978 and to Chicago in 2006.  In 2017, it was acquired by North Central College which established the Shimer Great Books School to continue offering its curriculum.

It has a long reputation as being intellectually original, demanding, and rigorous. The current academic program is based on a core curriculum sixteen required courses in the humanities, social sciences and natural sciences. All courses are small seminars with no more than twelve students, and were based on original sources from a list of about 200 core texts broadly based on the great books canon. Classroom instruction is Socratic discussion. Considerable writing is required, including two comprehensive examinations and a senior thesis. Students are admitted primarily on the basis of essays and interviews; no minimum grades or test scores were required. Shimer has one of the highest alumni doctorate rates in the country.

According to The New York Times, students "share[d] a love of books [and] a disdain for the conventional style of education. Many say they did not have a good high school experience". Students, who tend to be individualistic and creative thinkers, are encouraged to ask questions. Shimer historically averaged 125 students, and enrolled 97 in 2014. Most Shimer alumni went on to graduate studies.

Shimer was, until joining North Central College, governed internally by an assembly in which all community members had a vote.  In 2016, Shimer announced an agreement to be acquired by North Central College. The agreement came to fruition on June 1, 2017, when Shimer's faculty and curriculum were subsumed into North Central as a department known as the Shimer Great Books School of North Central College.

History 

In 1852, the pioneer town of Mount Carroll, Illinois, lacking a public school, incorporated the Mount Carroll Seminary with no land, no teachers and no money. The town persuaded Frances Wood and Cindarella Gregory, two schoolteachers from Ballston Spa, New York, to come and teach. On May 11, 1853, the new seminary opened in a local church with eleven students.

Unable to raise sufficient funds locally, the seminary's founders borrowed money to construct a building in 1854. They were discouraged by the school's finances and sold it to Wood and Gregory, who borrowed money for the purchase. In 1857, Wood married Henry Shimer, a mason who was a creditor of the seminary. In 1864, the overcrowded school began accepting female students only.

To ensure the seminary's long-term survival, in 1896 Frances Shimer reached an agreement with the University of Chicago in which the school became the Frances Shimer Academy of the University of Chicago and was loosely affiliated with the Baptist Church. She retired to Florida, never returning to the school, and died in 1901. University of Chicago president William Rainey Harper was the first to champion junior colleges in the United States, and in 1907 Shimer became one of the first schools to offer a junior-college program. The two-year junior-college program, operating with the original  
preparatory program, was accredited in 1920.
 
The college had a precipitous decline in enrollment and financial stability during and after the Great Depression, weathering the storm under five successive presidents. Its survival was due in part to the reorganization of the six-year preparatory program into a four-year junior college program and in part to steep salary reductions. In 1943, Shimer president Albin C. Bro invited the Department of Education at the University of Chicago to evaluate the college community; its 77 recommendations became the basis for Shimer's transformation from a conservative finishing school to a nontraditional, co-educational four-year college.

The school was renamed Shimer College in 1950, adopting the great-books curriculum then in place at the University of Chicago. The university connection dissolved in 1958 after the latter's decision to abandon the great-books plan, and Shimer narrowly avoided bankruptcy in 1957. The great-books program at Shimer continued, and the school enjoyed national recognition and a rapid growth in enrollment during the 1960s. In 1963, a Harvard Educational Review article listed Shimer as one of 11 colleges with an "ideal intellectual climate". According to a 1966 article in the education journal Phi Delta Kappan, Shimer "present[ed] impressive statistical evidence that their students are better prepared for graduate work in the arts and sciences and in the professions than those who have specialized in particular areas".

During the late 1960s, Shimer experienced a period of internal unrest known as the Grotesque Internecine Struggle, with disputes over curriculum changes, the extent to which student behavior should be regulated and inadequate fundraising by president Francis Joseph Mullin. Half the faculty and a large portion of the student body left as a result. Its financial problems worsened, and the school's survival was uncertain. Although Shimer's trustees voted to close the college at the end of 1973, the school was saved by intense student and faculty fundraising. In the school's 1977 bankruptcy filing, the trustees, in the words of board chair Barry Carroll, "put responsibility for the school's continuing on the shoulders of a very dedicated faculty of 12 and students who volunteered".

During the 1978 Christmas break, the faculty and 62 students borrowed trucks and moved the college into two "run-down" homes in Waukegan, Illinois, a suburb north of Chicago.
Shimer emerged from bankruptcy in 1980. During the next 25 years, the college purchased 12 surrounding homes and the former YWCA facility at Genesee and Franklin Streets to form a makeshift campus and slowly progressed towards financial stability. By 1988 its enrollment had grown from a low of 40 to 114, and income exceeded expenses. In 1991, Shimer received a grant from the National Endowment for the Humanities with the help of NEH chair and core-curriculum advocate Lynne Cheney; the grant revitalized the school's fundraising, helping it raise $2 million.

In 2006, Shimer again moved to the campus of the Illinois Institute of Technology (IIT) in Chicago. Although the institutions operated independently, they cooperated closely under a long-term agreement.

Shimer received national attention in 2009, when it was embroiled in "a battle over what some saw as a right-wing attempt to take over its board and administration". In February 2012 the college announced the appointment of Susan Henking, former professor of religious studies at Hobart and William Smith Colleges, as Shimer's 14th president.

In September 2014 Shimer again received media attention when Ben Miller of Washington Monthly ranked it as one of the worst colleges in America, according to a formula adjusting graduation rates to the percentage of minority and low-income students and factoring net expense to low-income students. In December 2014 Jon Ronson of The Guardian disputed Miller's claim, citing Miller's assertion that the ranking was "at least partly due to small sample sizes".

Academics

Curriculum history 

Shimer was one of four colleges in the U.S. which follow the great-books tradition begun by John Erskine. Erskine's Socratic seminar at Columbia University (begun in 1919) impacted his colleague, Mortimer J. Adler, who came to believe that the purpose of education was to engage student minds "in the study of individual works of merit ... accompanied by a discussion of the ideas, the values, and the forms embodied in such products of human art". Robert Maynard Hutchins, head of the University of Chicago from 1929 to 1951, brought Adler to the university and implemented a program (known as the Chicago Program and, later, the Hutchins Plan) based on Adler's ideas.
The Chicago program comprised sequences in the natural sciences, the humanities, and the social sciences which were supposed to integrate past and present work within these divisions of knowledge. In addition, these sequences were capped by work in philosophy and history. The emphasis in teaching was on small classes with bright students, where discussion could supplant monologue as the dominant pedagogic technique.... At the same time, in order to retain high academic standards and contact with the "frontiers of knowledge", the College's pedagogy emphasized reading originals (sometimes although not invariably, defined as Great Books).
Shimer, affiliated with the University of Chicago since 1896, adopted the Hutchins plan (including University of Chicago syllabi, comprehensive examinations and several university instructors) in 1950. When Hutchins left the university in 1951 and it abandoned the Hutchins Plan, Shimer continued to use it and it is still reflected in the college's curriculum.

Degree program 

Shimer was accredited by the Higher Learning Commission. Its core curriculum was a sequence of sixteen required courses in the humanities, social sciences, natural sciences and interdisciplinary studies. Basic-studies courses are generally taken during the first two years, advanced-studies during the final two years and integrative-studies courses in the final year. In addition to core courses students take electives, which offer basic instruction or in-depth work in particular subjects. Students may also take tutorials, with one or two students per course, tailored to their interests and similar in structure to the Oxford tutorial system.

Shimer College students did not pursue traditional majors, instead having broad concentrations in the humanities, natural sciences or social sciences. Within these areas, students could specialize in literature, mathematics, philosophy, political science or psychology.

The school's 200-book reading list remained largely faithful to the original Hutchins plan, with new works judiciously added to the core curriculum. These included voices originally overlooked in the formation of the canon, or not yet published when it originated, including Martin Luther King Jr., Carol Gilligan, Frantz Fanon, Michel Foucault and other contemporary authors. Readings were organized by broad historical and philosophical themes.

Small seminars were the sole form of instruction in all subjects, from mathematics to poetry. Classes were composed of no more than twelve students (the average class size was seven), who read and discussed only source material. In a process Shimer called "shared inquiry", "the text is the teacher, and thus the faculty member's role is to facilitate interaction between the text and the students". According to a former Shimer professor:
At Shimer, the professor is a facilitator, a guide on the side, not a sage on the stage – encouraging each student to contribute to the intellectual light being kindled in every class. Each student was expected to question and comment upon the text, to respond to one other’s insights, actively taking part in every discussion.... Students know their insights matter; they have something to offer to their peers, and to the life of the text being discussed. Some students are more exuberant than others, some would rather talk than listen; others may be a bit shy. The professor/facilitator must make sure that each student has a chance to shine, that each can feel confident, each can have the courage to ask what they think might be a stupid question. What are feared to be stupid questions are often the most provocative ones.

The curriculum emphasized writing; students were required to complete a semester project each term on a topic chosen in conjunction with an advisor, and were required to complete a research paper during their third year. All students needed to pass a basic-studies comprehensive examination to register for upper-level courses, and at least one area-studies comprehensive examination (usually in their area of concentration) to graduate. A senior thesis was required of all students. Usually an analytic or expository essay, it could also be a piece of original fiction, poetry, a performance or work of visual art. Students were encouraged to present their theses orally, and the public was invited to the presentations.

Special programs

Early Entrance program 
The Early Entrance program, which admitted students who had not yet graduated from high school, was pioneered by Hutchins at the University of Chicago in 1937 and adopted by Shimer in 1950. It continued with the support of the Ford Foundation, the Carnegie Foundation and the Surdna Foundation. In the past, up to 80 percent of Shimer's student body was composed of Early Entrance students.

Early entrants were admitted after the 10th or 11th grade, and followed the regular curriculum. The college considered applications from any interested students, with motivation, willingness to learn and intellectual curiosity the most important qualifications. Shimer encouraged applications from home-schooled students, accommodating their lack of credentials such as transcripts. In 2008, 16 percent of new students were early entrants or home-schooled.

Joint programs 

The Great Books + Law program, introduced in 2007, was offered in conjunction with the Chicago-Kent College of Law (the law school of the Illinois Institute of Technology) and the Vermont Law School and allowed students to complete undergraduate and law degrees in six (instead of seven) years. Shimer had a dual-enrollment program with Harold Washington College, one of the few community colleges in the U.S. with a great-books program. The program allowed HWC students to take a Shimer course, and was intended to encourage students to transfer to Shimer to complete their bachelor's degree. Whether these programs will continue at North Central is unknown.

Study abroad 
Shimer first offered a year of study abroad (in Paris) in 1961, and the college has had a biennial program in Oxford since 1963. The Shimer-in-Oxford program allowed third- or fourth-year students to study for one or two semesters in Oxford, supervised by a Shimer professor. Students took a core class each term with the supervising faculty; the rest of their work is completed in tutorials of self-selected subjects under the guidance of academics associated with the University of Oxford.

Teaching Fellows Program 
The Teaching Fellows Program, now discontinued, was a graduate-level great-books course designed for kindergarten through 12th-grade teachers. Although Shimer does not award graduate degrees, teachers could then earn professional development credit with the program; it complements traditional education courses by providing background knowledge for teachers to impart more content-rich instruction. The program was developed in conjunction with the Core Knowledge Foundation, founded in 1986 by E. D. Hirsch (author of Cultural Literacy: What Every American Needs to Know) to promote a common core in U.S. elementary education.

Faculty 

In 2014, Shimer had eleven full-time faculty and one part-time faculty member, and the student-faculty ratio was eight to one. All full-time faculty had doctoral degrees. Shimer instructors teach across disciplines; the "ideal is that any faculty member can teach any one of the core courses".

In 2017, seven Shimer faculty joined the Shimer School of Great Books at North Central College.

Admission 
Shimer applicants were evaluated according to their academic potential, and no minimum grade-point average or test score was required. Applicants were required to write essays analyzing their academic experience and demonstrating their creative talent. These essays and interviews were the primary criteria for admission. The college accepts students it believes will benefit from, and contribute to, its intellectual community. Barron’s Profiles of American Colleges rates Shimer "very competitive plus". Candidates were counseled before applying, and nearly 90 percent of those who applied were admitted.

In 2010, the average GPA of incoming students was 3.29 out of 4.0. Average composite scores on standardized college-admissions tests were 28 on the ACT (the 92nd percentile) and 1917 on the SAT (the 90th percentile).

Tuition and fees 
In 2014 full-time tuition was $27,491, and the total cost of attendance (including room, board and fees) was $41,615. All students received financial aid, with the average aid package $13,956. As of 2017, tuition and fees for the Shimer School will be identical to those of North Central College.

Recognition and rankings 

Shimer had one of the highest rates of doctoral candidates in the U.S. In a 1998 University of Wisconsin–Madison study, the college had the highest rate of graduates receiving doctoral degrees of any liberal-arts college and the third-highest rate of any undergraduate program in the nation. A 2009 report by Washington Monthly ranked Shimer third in graduate Ph.D. rate among U.S. liberal-arts colleges. Studies based on Higher Education Data Sharing Consortium data found that Shimer had the seventh-highest alumni Ph.D. rate of U.S. colleges and universities, and the highest rate for Ph.D.s in linguistics.

Shimer students who took the Graduate Record Exam outscored three out of four potential graduate students, "consistently rank[ing] among the best in the nation in scores on the verbal and analytical portions of the test" with average analytic scores in the 91st percentile.

The conservative Insight magazine named Shimer one of its "15 Most Politically-Incorrect Colleges": "colleges that had strong and effective traditional curricula that were not 'obsessed with the recent educational fads and fetishes such as multiculturalism and diversity. Barron's called Shimer one of the 300 best buys in college education, noting that "the success of the Shimer curriculum depends a great deal on the knowledge and skill of the faculty facilitators, who receive accolades ranging from 'fantastic' to 'brilliant. Shimer was one of the top 50 colleges in All-American Colleges: Top Schools for Conservatives, Old-Fashioned Liberals, and People of Faith, which highlights "programs that connect in a special way with the core values of the American founding and the vibrant intellectual traditions of the West".

In 2007, Shimer joined a national effort by the Education Conservancy to boycott participation in college-ranking surveys. President William Craig Rice said, "What Shimer does well – educating ourselves in on-going dialogue with the greatest minds of the past – can't be captured in the U.S. News measurements". Washington Monthly ranks Shimer 200th among liberal-arts colleges, based on social mobility, research and service. The college is unranked by U.S. News & World Report.

Campus 

Through May 2017, Shimer was located on the main campus of the Illinois Institute of Technology. In 1976 the American Institute of Architects named the IIT campus one of the 200 most significant works of architecture in the United States, and it was added to the National Register of Historic Places in 2005.

Shimer occupied  on two floors of the former Institute of Gas Technology complex. The complex, designed by Ludwig Mies van der Rohe, consists of four buildings (the southernmost formerly hosting the first industrial nuclear reactor in the U.S.) The college has access to the Paul V. Galvin Library, IIT's main research library, and Shimer's collection of 15,000 books has also been housed in the Galvin Library since the school relocated from Waukegan.

As of June 1, 2017, the Shimer School of Great Books of North Central College is located on the campus of North Central in Naperville, Illinois.

Organization and administration 

Until its move to become part of North Central College, "As a function of its mission to promote active citizenship" Shimer was "devoted to internal self-governance to an extent that is rare among institutions of higher education". Since 1977, Shimer has been governed internally by a body known as the Assembly. Begun informally in the years before the move to Waukegan, the Assembly was formalized with a constitution in 1980. Voting members included students, faculty, administrators, staff and trustees; alumni were members, but do not vote. This inclusive model of governance was unique in American higher education.

The Assembly had no independent legal authority, but governed "by virtue of the moral suasion established by communal deliberation". Its goal was to foster an environment in which "all the top-down bureaucracy of traditional colleges and universities has been replaced by participatory democracy committed to dialogue." In Chicago, Shimer students participated in the IIT Student Government Association, a liaison between students and university administration and a forum for student opinion.

In addition, Shimer had a Board of Trustees who appointed its presidents – including long serving president Don Moon and Shimer's last president Susan E. Henking, who successfully led the College to its new future at North Central College and was awarded an honorary doctorate in April 2017 in recognition of her service.

Student life 

The New York Times, calling Shimer "one of the smallest liberal arts colleges in the United States", described its students as "both valedictorians and high school dropouts. What the students share, besides a love of books, is a disdain for the conventional style of education. Many say they did not have a good high school experience." Shimer students tended to be individualistic, creative thinkers and are encouraged to be inquisitive. The college enrolled 97 students in 2014, about half from Illinois. Of these students 41 were women, 25 percent were students of color and 76 percent were age 24 or over. Forty percent were first-time, full-time college students. Of the full-time students attending for the first time in 2012, 86 percent returned for their second year. Sixty percent of students who entered in 2007 completed a bachelor's degree in six years.

The college has a tradition of community meals dating back to the Waukegan campus, when the community would meet for potluck meals and discuss matters of general interest. The Orange Horse, Shimer's biennial talent show since the 1960s, invites students, faculty and alumni to read poetry, sing, play music or tell jokes, individually or in groups. The Shimer theater program produces plays complementing its curriculum, offering anyone who wants to participate the chance to do so. Recent productions have included Anton Chekhov's Uncle Vanya and Eve Ensler's The Vagina Monologues.

In addition to student services at the McCormick Tribune Campus Center and its health and athletic facilities, while located in Chicago Shimer students could participate in the more than 150 student organizations sponsored by IIT (including Liit Magazine, IIT's student-run literary magazine and IIT's on-campus radio station, WIIT, where students can host a show). As students at North Central, Shimerians will have access to the full range of student services and student organizations.

Alumni 

Many Shimer alumni continued to graduate school; 50 percent earn master's degrees, and 21 percent earn doctorates. Another ten percent attend law school and five percent go to business school. As of 2008, Shimer had 5,615 living alumni. Nearly 25 percent of graduates are employed in education (elementary school through college), seven percent are attorneys and seven percent work in the computer-software industry.

Notable alumni
 Young Kim: Lawyer, legal educator and philosopher best known for Justice as Right Actions: An Original Theory of Justice in Conversation with Major Contemporary Accounts.
 Mary Anita Snook Southern: pioneer aviatrix
 Peter Cooley: Prize-winning poet, author, and professor of English at Tulane University
 Alan Dowty: Arab–Israeli conflict scholar and professor emeritus at the University of Notre Dame
 Robert Keohane: Political scientist, international relations scholar and professor at the Woodrow Wilson School of Public and International Affairs best known for After Hegemony: Cooperation and Discord in the World Political Economy
 Phoebe Snow: Grammy-nominated singer-songwriter best known for her 1974 hit, "Poetry Man"
 Laurie Spiegel: Composer, software engineer and electronic and computer music pioneer
 Sydney Spiesel: Medical inventor, Slate columnist and professor at the Yale University School of Medicine 
 Daniel Perlman: Former president of Suffolk University in Boston, Massachusetts and Webster University in Webster Groves, Missouri
 Nick Pippenger: Computing researcher and theorist, IBM Fellow and professor at Harvey Mudd College. Known for his work on the foundations of computer science, including complexity, computability and communications theory
 Jen Richards: Emmy nominated actor and producer of HerStory
 Tucker Viemeister: Award-winning industrial designer and holder of 32 US patents, called "industrial design's elder wonderkind" by I.D.
 Mary Wings: Writer, artist, and musician known for publishing the first lesbian underground comic book and a series of novels with lesbian detective Emma Victor
 Roland Winston: Leading figure in nonimaging optics and its applications to solar energy who has been called the "father of non-imaging optics". Director of the California Advanced Solar Technologies Institute
Dorian Electra: American singer, songwriter, video and performance artist.

Notes

References

Works cited

Further reading

External links 

 

 
Liberal arts colleges in Illinois
Universities and colleges in Chicago
Educational institutions established in 1853
1853 establishments in Illinois
Great Books
Universities and colleges affiliated with the Southern Baptist Convention
Defunct private universities and colleges in Illinois